The 113th United States Congress began on January 3, 2013. There were 12 new senators (eight Democrats, three Republicans, one independent) and 81 new representatives (47 Democrats, 34 Republicans) at the start of its first session. Additionally, five senators (four Democrats, one Republican) and 11 representatives (four Democrats, seven Republicans) took office on various dates in order to fill vacancies during the 113th Congress before it ended on January 3, 2015.

Due to redistricting after the 2010 census, 19 representatives were elected from newly established congressional districts.

The co-presidents of the House Democratic freshman class were Matt Cartwright of Pennsylvania, Joaquin Castro of Texas, John Delaney of Maryland, and Michelle Lujan Grisham of New Mexico, while the president of the House Republican freshman class was Luke Messer of Indiana. Additionally, the Republican's freshmen liaison was Ann Wagner of Missouri.

Senate

Took office January 3, 2013

Took office during the 113th Congress

House of Representatives

Took office January 3, 2013

Took office during the 113th Congress

See also 
 List of United States senators in the 113th Congress
 List of members of the United States House of Representatives in the 113th Congress by seniority

Notes

References

External links
Rollcall

Freshman class members
113